Christopher Jake Newberry (born November 20, 1994) is an American professional baseball pitcher who is currently a free agent. He has played in Major League Baseball (MLB) for the Kansas City Royals.

Career

Amateur career
Newberry attended Mira Mesa Senior High School in San Diego, California. The Kansas City Royals selected him in the 37th round of the 2012 MLB draft while he was in class. He signed with the Royals, beginning his professional career.

Kansas City Royals
Newberry made his professional debut that season with the Arizona League Royals, going 1-0 with a 2.81 ERA over 16 innings. He spent 2013 with the Burlington Royals, going 1-1 with a 2.68 ERA over 11 games (six starts), 2014 with the Idaho Falls Chukars in which he went 6-4 with a 4.50 ERA over 68 innings, and 2015 with the Lexington Legends, going 4-2 with a 5.04 ERA 35 relief appearances. Newberry spent 2016 with both Lexington and the Wilmington Blue Rocks, compiling a combined 3-2 record and 2.57 ERA over 35 games, and 2017 with the Northwest Arkansas Naturals and the Omaha Storm Chasers, going 6-4 with a 2.61 ERA over 62 relief innings. He returned to Northwest Arkansas and Omaha in 2018, going 5-0 with a 1.63 ERA over 41 relief appearances.

The Royals promoted Newberry to the major leagues on August 18, 2018. He made his major league debut on August 20. He finished his rookie season with a 4.73 ERA across 14 appearances.

In 2019 with the Royals, Newberry recorded a 3.77 ERA with 29 strikeouts in 27 games. With the 2020 Kansas City Royals, Newberry appeared in 20 games, compiling a 1-0 record with 4.09 ERA and 24 strikeouts in 22.0 innings pitched.

In 2021, Newberry struggled to a 16.62 ERA across 4 appearances for the Royals, and was designated for assignment following the promotion of Jackson Kowar on June 7, 2021. He was outrighted to Triple-A Omaha on June 10.

Philadelphia Phillies
On December 14, 2021, Newberry signed a minor league contract with the Philadelphia Phillies. On July 24, 2022, the Phillies released Newberry.

Personal
Newberry and his wife, Tiffany, were married in November 2019.

References

External links

Living people
1994 births
Baseball players from San Diego
Liga de Béisbol Profesional Roberto Clemente pitchers
Major League Baseball pitchers
Kansas City Royals players
Arizona League Royals players
Burlington Royals players
Idaho Falls Chukars players
Lexington Legends players
Wilmington Blue Rocks players
Surprise Saguaros players
Criollos de Caguas players
Northwest Arkansas Naturals players
Omaha Storm Chasers players